The 2004–05 Temple Owls men's basketball team represented Temple University in the 2004–05 NCAA Division I men's basketball season. They were led by head coach John Chaney and played their home games at the Liacouras Center. The Owls are members of the Atlantic 10 Conference. They finished the season 16–14, 11–5 in A-10 play, and reached the 2005 National Invitation Tournament.

Roster

References

2014-15 Temple Owls Men's Basketball Media Guide

Temple
Temple Owls men's basketball seasons
Temple
Temple
Temple